Vapor City is the first album released by Travis Stewart, p.k.a Machinedrum on Ninja Tune and his nineteenth release under the Machinedrum name overall. It was released on September 29, 2013.

Production 
The concept for Vapor City came about through a series of vivid, recurring dreams Stewart had about a fictional city. Each track on the album is meant to explore and define a different district or neighborhood within this world.

Soon after its release, an interactive website was launched allowing fans and subscribers to 'unlock' the various districts of Vapor City, granting them access to exclusive content and unheard music.

Reception 

Reception to the record was favorable, with many critics responding positively to Stewart's of-the-moment blend of footwork, jungle, and bass influences.

Track listing

References

Machinedrum albums
2013 albums